JF (Bangladesh) Limited, previously known as James Finlay Bangladesh, is a prominent shipping and logistics business in Bangladesh. It is a successor firm of James Finlay Limited, a leading Scottish trading company in the British Empire.

History 
The company was incorporated in Bengal in 1901. After the end of colonial rule, the British Finlays Group operated the company for 57 years, until 2004, when it was sold to a group of Bangladeshi businessmen under the JF (Bangladesh) Limited name. 

It received a gold medal for exports from 2000 to 2001 from Prime Minister Khaleda Zia.

They represent 52 global charter vessels company in Bangladesh. It provides seamen to shipping companies around the globe. It works as a consultancy and warehouse services to The New Sylhet Tea Estate Limited, Baraoora (Sylhet) Tea Company Limited, Consolidate Tea & Lands Co. (Bangladesh) Limited, and the Burjan Tea Estate Limited. 

The company is headquartered at Finlay House in Agrabad, Chittagong.

Subsidiaries 

 Local representative of Protection and indemnity insurance
 Local representative of  Lloyd's Agency.
 Liner Agency Representation
 Local agent of InterOil
 Finlay Bazar
 Finlay Travels

References

Transport companies established in 1901
Companies based in Chittagong
Shipping companies of Bangladesh
1901 establishments in India
Conglomerate companies of Bangladesh